YVR Sustainability is an operations department at Vancouver International Airport that is concerned with airport green initiatives. Its focus is to expand the airport quality of YVR without harm to the environment or affecting the community in a negative way. It focuses on a variety of initiatives having to do with heating, transport, energy consumption, recycling and noise. YVR's sustainability is also known and infamous for its green art linked to the environment and community and its indoor nature displays.

YVR's sustainability projects

Energy Reduction Committee
YVR's Vancouver Airport Services created an energy reduction committee in 1999 to create new energy-reducing initiatives. The YVR website describes these different initiatives such as "installing an econo-mode setting on baggage conveyor belts to shut down conveyors when no bags are present; installing carbon dioxide sensors to control heating, ventilation and air conditioning (HVAC) according to the number of people in area; and patenting a black box to regulate electrical power to the flight information display monitors when no flights are scheduled." In 2005, the committee introduced "installation of low-energy Light Emitting Diodes (LED) lighting on several taxiways, installation of more efficient, brighter lighting on Levels 2 and 3 of the car parking structure, upgrades to the chilled water distribution system, and replacement of all Airport Authority computer equipment with newer, more efficient models." The building and lighting system are designed to utilize as much daylight as possible so that it is the primary lighting source. The Committee claims to have saved more than 24 gigawatt hours of electricity and $5.5 million since the team's creation.

Electrification of ground support equipment 
In 2015, the airport set a goal for 50% of the ground support equipment to run on electric power by the year 2020. This goal was achieved early, as by late 2019, 53% of these machines operated on electric power. The airport installed 50 charging stations to support this operation.  

The airport also has a comprehensive fleet management plan, to ensure that  ground support equipment operators maintain and electrify the fleet of the right size. They also have eight battery electric apron buses to support the operation of aircraft on remote stands separate from the terminal building.

Solar-powered hot water
The solar-powered hot water systems were installed in the airport's Domestic and International terminals in 2003. The 100 solar panels were placed on the roof of the YVR building and will heat more than 800-gallons of water each hour. This has resulted in approximately $110,000 and 8569 gigajoules saved each year. The project was partly funded by BC Hydro working with the Vancouver International Airport Authority to reduce energy consumption and costs at YVR. YVR also uses nightly energy set backs, carbon dioxidesensors, and improved scheduling and system tune-ups since 2001 which has led to a decrease of 25 per cent in natural gas usage.

Taxi incentive program
YVR has 100 hybrid and natural gas-operated taxis hired to pick up and drop off passengers. The Airport Authority created a program in 2004 that gave incentive for alternative fuel taxis and was successful by improving the average fleet fuel economy by 47% by 2009. This is due to the large traffic of passengers travelling to and from the airport by taxi per year.

Green wall
In June 2009, YVR had a green wall installed by the Canada Line YVR–Airport Station and can best be viewed from the International Departures terminal on Level 3 and from the International Arrivals terminal on Level 2. This is the first Canadian airport with a living green wall and the largest in North America. The green wall measures "18-metres high and 12 -metres wide and is home to 28,249 individual plants on 2,173 panels and houses a built-in irrigation and feeding system." The plants it consists of are Euonymus japonicus microphyllus, Euonymus japonicus albovariegatus microphyllus, Polypodium glycyrrhiza, and Ophiopogon japonicus nanus''. Benefits of a green wall on the building include improving air quality, reducing noise pollution (the green wall is located near the Sky Train), cooling the area down and saving on energy costs, and decreases carbon dioxide emissions in the environment. YVR includes other environmental indoor installations such as its indoor garden, aquarium, and a freshwater creek. The 30,000 galloon salt water aquarium at YVR is home to about 850 samples of British Columbia marine life. There is also a 750-gallon jelly fish tank and a 60-metre long fresh water creek located nearby. These installations serve an aesthetic purpose and illustrate YVR's position on green initiatives.

YVR Fuel Project 
The YVR Fuel project plans to build an underground pipeline and upgrade an airport fuel terminal near the Fraser River. In 2014, the YVR Fuel Project was granted approval with 64 conditions. An information bulletin posted by the Ministry of Environment of British Columbia announced that the project is "not expected to result in any significant adverse effects, based on the mitigation measures and conditions of the Environmental Assessment Certificate." Nonetheless, the YVR Airport Fuel Facilities will have to carry out the project in accordance to the conditions made by the Environmental Assessment Office. Key conditions deal with spill and fire prevention, preparedness and response, cleaning, inspection, dealing with pollution liabilities, environmental remediation, and compensating for Aboriginals loss under the Fisheries Act.
Marine pilots will have to be specially trained for the river's environment, tankers double-hulled, pre-screened and each boat will have to have two tugs. The reason for the YVR fuel upgrade is because the Fuel Facilities Corp. states the current fuel-delivery system is not sustainable and too dependent on an older pipeline coming from Burnaby, British Columbia and shipments from Washington, USA. With its own fuel,  YVR will have more room and independence to welcome new flights and airlines.

Rapid transportation
Along with the Taxi Incentive Program, YVR has a very close and rapid SkyTrain system connected directly to the airport. The Canada Line at YVR-Airport Station opened in 2009 and offers inexpensive travel to central Downtown Vancouver in approximately 25 minutes. Going from downtown to the airport costs $3.75 for adultfare and $8.75 ($3.75 plus a $5 YVR "AddFare" charge) from the airport to downtown. This reduces emissions by enabling people to access the airport on electric public transit.

Recycling
YVR has 450 recycling containers evenly distributed and located around its terminals, divided for recycling plastic and paper. The containers themselves are made from recycled aluminum, steel and plastic and help recycle over 1,250,000 kg of material each year.

Noise management 
The Vancouver International Airport Security submitted a 2009 - 2013 Noise Management Plan to the Canadian Ministry of Transport in August 2013 which was reviewed and approved. This Management Plan included initiatives to help with noise complaints that YVR Security had received. A total of 16 initiatives were identified and are outlined in the Noise Management Plan. The plan is flexible and allows room for new community issues that may arise within the five-year program. The plan's main goal is to balance the needs of having 24-hour airport services while minimizing noise disturbances associated with aircraft services for those living nearby.

Other YVR facilities

References

External links
 Vancouver International Airport's Noise Management
 Flexible Solar Panel

Aviation and the environment
Sustainability in Canada
Sustainable urban planning
Sustainability
Transport in Richmond, British Columbia